Jo David Meyer Lysne (born 9 April 1994 in Førde, Norway) is a Norwegian guitarist and composer known from collaboration with Mats Eilertsen, Wendra Hill, Bendik Baksaas.

Biography

Education 
Lysne studied music at Sund Folk college (2013–14), then he studied improvised music at Norwegian Academy of Music (2014-2018), and lately composition at Norwegian Academy of Music (2018-).

Discography

Solo albums 
 2020: Kroksjø (Hubro Music), duo with Mats Eilertsen
 2019: Henger i Luften (Hubro Music), with Joel Ring, Karl Hjalmar Nyberg, Johanne Skaansar, Martin Lie Svendsen, David Timme Cariano
 2017: Meander (Øra Fonogram), duo with Mats Eilertsen

Collaborations 
 With Jenny Berger Myhre
 2017: Lint (The Lumen Lake)

 With 'Wendra Hill For'
 2017: Stretch. Flex. Draw. (Self release)

References

External links 
 

21st-century Norwegian guitarists
Norwegian guitarists
Norwegian male guitarists
Norwegian composers
Norwegian male composers
1994 births
Musicians from Bergen
People from Førde
Living people
21st-century Norwegian male musicians